The First Satō Cabinet is the 61st Cabinet of Japan headed by Eisaku Satō from November 9, 1964 to February 17, 1967.

Cabinet

First Cabinet reshuffle 
The first Cabinet reshuffle took place on June 3, 1965.

Second Cabinet reshuffle 
The second Cabinet reshuffle took place on August 1, 1966.

Third Cabinet reshuffle 
The third Cabinet reshuffle took place on December 3, 1966.

References 

Cabinet of Japan
1964 establishments in Japan
Cabinets established in 1964
Cabinets disestablished in 1967